Glory Alley is a 1952 musical drama film directed by Raoul Walsh. It stars Ralph Meeker and Leslie Caron.

Plot

New Orleans newspaper columnist Gabe Jordan, about to retire, tells the story of a most unforgettable character, boxer Socks Barbarossa.

One night, about to have a bout for the championship, Socks abruptly flees the ring and arena. It mystifies everyone, from his manager Peppi Donato to his sweetheart Angie Evans, not to mention her blind father, the Judge.

Socks' opponent taunts him afterward in the empty arena, so Socks flattens him. Peppi offers him a job at a nightclub he intends to buy where Angie has been working as a dancer. Socks also owns the contract of another fighter, Newsboy Addams, but raffles it off. "Pig" Nichols, a gangster, wins the contract, but both Socks and the boxer are drafted and go off to war.

The Judge continues to think poorly of Socks, even after he returns to town as a decorated hero. A surgeon, Dr. Ardley, believes there's a 50-50 chance of correcting the Judge's blindness, and it comes to light that he and Socks are acquainted from their Milwaukee younger days. Socks has scars, visible and not, from a long-ago experience in the ring, that caused him to panic on the night of the most recent fight.

Angie, too, vouches for Socks' character to the Judge, who didn't even realize she'd been working in a club to make ends meet. He concedes to the operation, Socks returns to the ring and great success, and everyone goes to meet newspaperman Gabe at the club to celebrate.

Cast

 Ralph Meeker as Socks Barbarossa 
 Leslie Caron as Angela Evans
 Kurt Kasznar as Gus 'The Judge' Evans
 Gilbert Roland as Peppi Donnato
 John McIntire as Gabe Jordan / Narrator
 Louis Armstrong as Shadow Johnson
 Jack Teagarden as Musician
 Dan Seymour as Sal Nichols (The Pig)
 Larry Gates as Dr. Robert Ardley
 Pat Goldin as Jabber
 John Indrisano as Spider, the Bartender
 Mickey Little as Domingo
 Dick Simmons as Dan
 Pat Valentino as Terry Waulker
 David McMahon as Frank, the Policeman

Reception
According to MGM records, the film earned $426,000 in the U.S. and Canada and $181,000 overseas, resulting in a loss of $621,000.

Comic book adaptation
 Eastern Color Movie Love #17 (October 1952)

References

External links
 
 
 
 

1952 films
1950s musical drama films
American black-and-white films
American musical drama films
American boxing films
1950s English-language films
Films directed by Raoul Walsh
Films scored by Georgie Stoll
Films set in New Orleans
Metro-Goldwyn-Mayer films
Films adapted into comics
1952 drama films
1950s American films